Pseudoeurycea longicauda is a species of salamander in the family Plethodontidae.
It is endemic to Mexico.

Its natural habitat is subtropical or tropical moist montane forests.
It is threatened by habitat loss.

References

Amphibians of Mexico
Pseudoeurycea
Taxonomy articles created by Polbot
Amphibians described in 1983